Isso is a comune (municipality) in the Province of Bergamo in the Italian region of Lombardy, located about  east of Milan and about  southeast of Bergamo.  

Isso borders the following municipalities: Barbata, Camisano, Castel Gabbiano, Covo, Fara Olivana con Sola.

References